This page is a list of all historically significant Art Deco and Moderne buildings in the Melbourne metropolitan area.

Office buildings
 Alkira House, 18 Queen Street, Melbourne
 Australasian Catholic Assurance Building, 118-126 Queen Street, Melbourne
 Australian Natives' Association Building, 28-32 Elizabeth Street, Melbourne
 Buckley & Nunn, 310 Bourke Street, Melbourne
 Carlow House, 289 Flinders Lane, Melbourne
 Century House, 133 Swanston Street, Melbourne
 Coles Store No 12, 299-307 Bourke Street, Melbourne
 Commercial Union Chambers, 411 Collins Street, Melbourne 
 Commonwealth Bank, 225 Bourke Street, Melbourne
 Manchester Unity Building, 291 Swanston Street, Melbourne
 Newspaper House, 247 Collins Street, Melbourne
 McPherson's Building, 546 Collins Street, Melbourne
 Mitchell House, 352-362 Lonsdale Street, Melbourne
 Myer Emporium, 314-336 Bourke Street, Melbourne
 Trustees Executors & Agency Company Building, 401 Collins Street, Melbourne
 Yule House, 309-311 Little Collins Street

Apartment and residential buildings
 Burnham Beeches, Sherbrooke Road, Sassafras
 Glamis Towers, Loch Street, St Kilda
 Holroyd court, St Kilda East
 Harry Winbush's house at corner of Fletcher and Nicholson Streets, Essendon
 Lissadurn (Australia) Lissadurn, Toorak Road, South Yarra

Cinemas and theatres

 Capitol Theatre, Swanston Street, Melbourne
 Her Majesty's Theatre (Interior Only), 199-227 Exhibition Street, Melbourne
 Rivoli Cinemas, 200 Camberwell Road, Melbourne (also known as Rivoli Theatre)
 Sun Theatre, Yarraville
 The Astor Theatre, St Kilda
 Palais Theatre, St Kilda

Public buildings and facilities

 Michael Tuck Stand, Glenferrie Oval
 Shrine of Remembrance, St Kilda Road, Melbourne - although designed in a neo-classical style, the building possesses a number of distinctive Art Deco features.
 Heidelberg Town Hall
 Richmond Town Hall
 Former Russell Street Police Headquarters, 336-376 Russell Street, Melbourne

Institutional buildings and facilities

 Centenary Hall, 104-110 Exhibition Street, Melbourne
 Freemasons' Hospital, 166 Clarendon Street, East Melbourne
 Mac.Robertson Girls' High School, 350 Kings Way, Albert Park
 Mercy Hospital, 159 Grey Street, East Melbourne
 Newman College, University of Melbourne, Parkville
 Repatriation Commission Outpatient Clinic, 310 St Kilda Rd, Southbank

Hotels and pubs
 Prince of Wales Hotel, St Kilda
 Greyhound Hotel, St Kilda

References

Melbourne
 
Art Deco buildings